Carl Bell may refer to:

 Carl Bell (musician) (born 1967), American musician and producer
 Carl Bell (physician) (born 1947), professor of psychiatry and public health at the University of Illinois at Chicago
Carl Bell (wrestler) (1925–1966), Native American wrestler
 Carl Bell (animator) (1930–2022), Disney animator